List of Teachers episodes may refer to:

 List of Teachers (British TV series) episodes, a comedy-drama series 2001–2004
 List of Teachers (2006 TV series) episodes, an American version of the British series
 List of Teachers (2016 TV series) episodes, an American sitcom on TV Land based on a web series

See also
 Teachers (disambiguation)#Film and television